Hocus Pocus 2 is a 2022 American fantasy comedy film directed by Anne Fletcher, written by Jen D'Angelo and produced by Walt Disney Pictures. A sequel to the 1993 film Hocus Pocus, it stars Bette Midler, Sarah Jessica Parker, Kathy Najimy, and Doug Jones reprising their roles, with Sam Richardson, Whitney Peak, Belissa Escobedo, Tony Hale, and Hannah Waddingham joining the cast in new roles.

Filming took place from October 2021 to January 2022 in Rhode Island, replacing Salem, Massachusetts. It was released on Disney+ on September 30, 2022. The film received mixed reviews, praising the cast performances, humor, and nostalgia, but criticized the plot.

Plot
 
In 1653 Salem, Reverend Traske banishes a young Winifred Sanderson after she defied church authority by refusing to marry John Pritchett. Rather than allow her sisters, Mary and Sarah, be taken from her, Winifred escapes with them to a nearby forbidden forest.  There they meet Mother Witch who gifts Winifred her magic book for her sixteenth birthday but explicitly warns the sisters against casting a spell known as the Magicae Maxima, which makes the user all powerful.  Mother Witch also teaches the sisters to retain their youthfulness by killing children.

In 2022, twenty-nine years after the Sanderson sisters were resurrected by the Black Flame Candle, Salem teenagers Becca and Izzy prepare to celebrate both Halloween and Becca's sixteenth birthday but turn down a party invitation from their estranged friend, Cassie Traske. Becca and Izzy visit a magic shop (formerly the Sanderson cottage) run by Gilbert, who gifts Becca a candle for their annual birthday ritual. The girls light the candle and discover that it is another Black Flame Candle. As there is a full moon and the girls are both virgins, the candle resurrects the Sanderson sisters once again. The girls outwit the sisters in a local Walgreens and escape to the magic shop where they discover that Gilbert tricked them into reviving the witches, having seen them on Halloween in 1993 and been taught how to make the candle by Book.

The sisters catch up to the girls and see a campaign flyer belonging to Mayor Jefry Traske, Cassie's father and Reverend Traske's descendant. Winifred decides they will cast the Magicae Maxima spell to eliminate him and take revenge on Salem. The sisters trap Izzy and Becca in the basement and leave to hunt down Traske, whose blood is needed to complete the spell. They force Gilbert to collect the other ingredients.

The girls escape and head to the Traske house to warn the mayor while the sisters find their way to the town's Halloween carnival and enchant the citizens to help them find the mayor. Meanwhile, Gilbert digs up Billy Butcherson, who has been awake but entombed since 1993. He needs Billy's head for the spell but tricks him into helping him collect the other ingredients first. The girls reunite with Cassie and trap the sisters within a salt circle in Cassie's garage before Mayor Traske returns home. The three teens make amends with one another, but their reunion is interrupted when the sisters escape the circle and kidnap Cassie to use her blood instead. Becca and Izzy follow them to the forbidden forest where Gilbert has assembled the ingredients and soon discover that Becca is also a witch.

The sisters partially cast the spell and increase their power, but Becca distracts them while Izzy rescues Cassie. Becca convinces the Book that it does not have to answer to Winifred, and she and the Book flee further into the forest. The Book shows them a warning about the Magicae Maxima spell, stating that whoever casts it must give up what they cherish most. The girls agree to warn Winifred of the price of the spell but are too late: she becomes all powerful as Mary and Sarah fade to dust. Winifred grows despondent and begs the teenagers to use their newfound powers to save her sisters. While they cannot save them, Becca, Cassie and Izzy join together in a coven and cast a reuniting spell, so Winifred happily fades away to be reunited with her sisters.

Gilbert and Billy join the girls. Billy starts to fade away, realizing that all of Winifred's spells have been undone and relieved to finally head to his eternal rest. The girls decide to give Book a new home and continue practicing their magic as they walk off into the night in a similar manner as the Sanderson sisters. As they leave, a crow, identical to the one that Mother Witch had shapeshifted into, flies overhead.

Cast 
 Bette Midler as Winifred "Winnie" Sanderson, the oldest of the three Sanderson sisters. Winifred loves to sing. Her signature magical ability is electrokinesis, but she has extensive knowledge of dark magic thanks to her prized sentient spell book. As the leader of the trio, Winifred is often frustrated by her younger sisters' incompetence.
 Taylor Paige Henderson as young Winifred Sanderson
 Sarah Jessica Parker as Sarah Sanderson, the youngest of the three Sanderson sisters. Sarah's magical gift is a hypnotic siren call, which she uses through her song "Come Little Children". Her immature, lusty, and often airheaded nature exasperates Winifred.
 Juju Brener as young Sarah Sanderson
 Kathy Najimy as Mary Sanderson, the middle of the three Sanderson sisters. Mary has the magical ability to track children with an enhanced sense of smell. She looks up to her elder sister, Winifred, and constantly seeks her approval.
 Nina Kitchen as young Mary Sanderson
 Sam Richardson as Gilbert, the owner of the Olde Salem Magic Shoppe, the former home of the Sanderson Sisters. Having witnessed the sisters' initial defeat in 1993, he subsequently sought out to facilitate their eventual return.
 Jaylin Pryor as teen Gilbert
 Doug Jones as William "Billy" Butcherson, a former love interest of Winifred. She spitefully poisoned him on May 1, 1693, when she caught him with her sister Sarah. He is raised from the dead as a zombie. However, Billy reveals he only shared one kiss with Winifred and did not reciprocate her feelings for him in their youth as previously believed.
 Austin J. Ryan as young William "Billy" Butcherson
 Whitney Peak as Becca, a high school student and aspiring witch who accidentally conjures the Sanderson Sisters on her 16th birthday.
 Belissa Escobedo as Izzy, Becca's quirky best friend. She accidentally conjures the Sanderson Sisters with Becca.
 Tony Hale as Jefry Traske, the Mayor of Salem and father of Cassie.
 Hale also played Reverend Traske, Jefry and Cassie's ancestor from the Sanderson Sisters' past, who is also responsible for the Sisters becoming evil witches.
 Hannah Waddingham as the Mother Witch, a mysterious and sinister witch who gifts the spell book to the young Sanderson Sisters.
 Lilia Buckingham as Cassie Traske, the Mayor's daughter and an estranged popular friend of Becca and Izzy. She helps Becca to stop the Sanderson Sisters.
 Froy Gutierrez as Mike, Cassie's inept boyfriend who offends Becca and Izzy.
 Ginger Minj, Kornbread Jeté, and Kahmora Hall as drag queens impersonating Winifred, Mary, and Sarah, respectively, during a contest.

Amanda Shepherd, Garry Marshall, and Penny Marshall make uncredited appearances as Emily Binx, Master Devil, and Medusa Lady through archive footage from the first film. Additionally, three stand-in extras portrayed Max Dennison, Dani Dennison and Allison Watts, the three protagonists of the first film, originally portrayed by Omri Katz, Thora Birch and Vinessa Shaw, in a flashback sequence narrated by Gilbert to The Sanderson Sisters.

Production

Development 
In July 2014, it was announced that The Walt Disney Company was developing a supernatural-themed film about witches, and that Tina Fey was on board as a producer and star. However, Deadline Hollywood debunked rumors that the film was a sequel to Hocus Pocus. In November 2014, Bette Midler said in a Reddit "Ask Me Anything" that she was ready and willing to return for a sequel as Winifred Sanderson. She also said her co-stars Sarah Jessica Parker and Kathy Najimy were interested in reprising the roles of Sarah and Mary Sanderson as well, but stressed that Disney had yet to greenlight any sequel, encouraging fans of the original film to persuade Disney to make one. In November 2015, Midler stated in a Facebook Q&A that "after all these years and all the fan demand, I do believe I can stand and firmly say an unequivocal no" in response to a question about a sequel.

In June 2016, actor Doug Jones mentioned that Disney had been considering a sequel, and behind the scenes discussions were in place to possibly continue the series. In October 2016, while promoting her HBO show Divorce, Sarah Jessica Parker was asked by Andy Cohen about a sequel. Her response was "I would love that. I think we've been very vocal that we're very keen", yet she insisted that fans should encourage Disney to develop a sequel. In Hocus Pocus in Focus: The Thinking Fan's Guide to Disney's Halloween Classic, author Aaron Wallace identifies several potential approaches for a sequel, but notes that the project's biggest challenge is the Walt Disney Studios' interest in tentpole projects that promise very high box office returns.

In September 2017, Hocus Pocus writer Mick Garris admitted that he was working on a script for Hocus Pocus 2 after years of rumors and speculation and that it would potentially be developed as a television film for Disney Channel, Freeform or ABC. It was later confirmed that it would be instead a remake to air on Freeform, with The Royals writer Scarlett Lacey attached to write and the original film producer David Kirschner executive producing, with original director Kenny Ortega not expected to be involved. The following month, Midler said she was not fond of the idea of a remake and she would not be taking part in it regardless she was offered some kind of role or not, expressing doubts on how they would be able to successfully recast her role as Winifred Sanderson.

In February 2018, Jones revealed that there had been talks to do a sequel set twenty years after the original film and that he was approached to be involved on it, though he admitted that he was still interested on reprising his role as Billy Butcherson. In July 2018, a book titled Hocus Pocus and the All-New Sequel was released, containing a novelization of the film and a sequel story. The sequel focuses on Max and Allison's daughter, Poppy, who grew up hearing the family story of the original film and parents who avoid Halloween as much as possible. Poppy is skeptical of the tale and ends up in the Sanderson house on Halloween, twenty-five years to the day after the movie, in an attempt to prove there is nothing to the story.

In October 2019, a sequel was announced to be in development as a Disney+ exclusive film, with a screenplay written by Jen D'Angelo. In March 2020, Adam Shankman signed on to direct Hocus Pocus 2 concurrently to his work on the Enchanted sequel Disenchanted.

Casting 
On November 1, 2019, Bette Midler, Sarah Jessica Parker, and Kathy Najimy expressed interest in reprising their roles as the Sanderson sisters in the sequel. In September 2020, Midler revealed that she has entered talks to return in the film as Winifred, and in October 2020, she said she would return alongside Parker and Najimy, though their returns were not officially confirmed until May 2021. In October 2021, it was announced that Taylor Paige Henderson had been cast as one of the three leads. Shortly afterwards, Sam Richardson was reported to be in final negotiations to join the cast in an undisclosed role. That same month, Tony Hale has joined the cast as the mayor of Salem, Jefry Traske, and the full supporting cast was confirmed on October 31, 2021, including Hannah Waddingham and the return of Doug Jones, who portrayed William "Billy" Butcherson in the original film. In March 2022, it was announced that Thora Birch would not be reprising the role of Dani Dennison from the previous film. Birch later revealed she would have appeared in the film but couldn't due to a scheduling conflict. In the summer of that year, it was then announced that Sean Murray, Larry Bagby, Tobias Jelinek, Omri Katz, and Vinessa Shaw would also not be reprising their roles as Thackery Binx, Ice, Jay, Max, and Allison, respectively.

Pre-production 
On October 29, 2020, Midler stated that a story outline for the sequel has been completed, which she praised as "pretty great" along with Najimy and Jessica Parker. On November 3, Midler revealed that the producers are trying to re-hire several members of the first film's production team that are alive and hadn't retired, as they felt much of the success of the first film came from the work of the behind-the-scenes team. In April 2021, Anne Fletcher replaced Shankman as the director due to his directing duties with Disenchanted, although he did remain as an executive producer on the film.

Filming 
Production was scheduled to begin in the middle of 2021, in Salem, Massachusetts. In September 2021, sets for Hocus Pocus 2 were confirmed being built at Chase Farms in Lincoln, Rhode Island, and Washington Square in Newport, Rhode Island.  Filming began on October 18, 2021, in Providence, Rhode Island, under the working title Black Flame. All scenes Samuel Skelton High School was shot in the Moses Brown School (exteriors)  and in the La Salle Academy (interior).

Filming also took place on November 8, 2021, in Newport's Washington Square taking place in a modern Salem, Massachusetts. On December 10, 2021, filming began in Federal Hill, which was transformed with a Halloween-themed backdrop. On January 26, 2022, Midler confirmed that filming had completed.

Music 

In October 2021, it was announced that John Debney, the composer of the original film, was set to return to score the sequel. The soundtrack, which features two new songs in addition to Debney’s score, was released digitally by Walt Disney Records on September 30, 2022 and will be released physically on November 11, 2022.

Marketing 
The first teaser trailer was released on June 28, 2022. The teaser trailer reached 43.6 million views in its first 24 hours while on Twitter, the #HocusPocus became a top trend of the day on Twitter following the teaser's debut. The social media conversation was also the most gender balanced of the comps at 51 percent male and 49 percent female. On August 29, 2022, a first look at Doug Jones as Billy was released showing the character resurrected again by the Sanderson sisters. On September 9, 2022, the official trailer for the film premiered at the 2022 D23 Expo and was released online afterward. On September 21, 2022, the first look at RuPaul's Drag Race trio as the Sanderson Sisters plus a new brand poster were released. After the release of the film, in October, 2022, the Sanderson Sisters and other material based on the film were included in the video game Disney Magic Kingdoms for a Halloween Event focused in Hocus Pocus 2,  although with the characters involved in a new storyline unrelated to the events of the film.

Release 
Hocus Pocus 2 was released on September 30, 2022, on Disney+.

Reception

Audience viewership 
In October 2022, Disney+ reported Hocus Pocus 2 was the service's most-viewed film premiere in the United States, based on number of hours streamed in the first three days of its release. Disney later reported that Hocus Pocus 2 was the service's most-viewed film.

According to Whip Media, Hocus Pocus 2 was the 2nd most anticipated film of September 2022, the most watched straight-to-streaming title of 2022 in its first three days, as of October 2022, the most watched film across all platforms in the United States, during the week of September 30, 2022 to October 2, 2022, the 2nd during the week of October 9, 2022, the 4th during the week of October 23, 2022, as well as the 4th during the week of October 30, 2022, and the 9th during the week of November 4, 2022 to November 6, 2022. According to the streaming aggregator Reelgood, Hocus Pocus 2 was the most watched program across all platforms, during the weeks of October 5, 2022 and October 14, 2022.

Critical response 

The review aggregator website Rotten Tomatoes reported an approval rating of 64% based on 154 reviews, with an average rating of 5.70/10. The website's critics consensus reads, "Hocus Pocus 2 is basically a boiling cauldron of nostalgia, but that's more than enough for this belated sequel to cast a reasonably effective spell." Metacritic gave it a weighted average score of 56 out of 100 based on 32 critics, indicating "mixed or average reviews".

Claire Shaffer of The New York Times said that while the film "may be a blatant attempt by Disney to continue propping up its streaming platform Disney+ [...], it manages to capture the same hokey magic of the original while creatively updating its humor".  Ani Bundel of NBC News asserted, "The result is a joyful film that works well for both the 5-year-old child who is finally getting the hang of Halloween and the 15-year-old who still enjoys kid movies at heart. But most of all, it's meant for those 25 and up, whom Disney spent the last two decades preparing to appreciate a new installment of a cult classic franchise in the making." Jennifer Green of Common Sense Media gave the movie four stars out of five, complimented the depiction of positive messages, role models, and the diverse representations across the characters, while calling the film a "campy but entertaining sequel". Amelia Emberwing of IGN rated the film seven out of ten, writing, "The Sanderson sisters are back and the cost is a lot steeper than hell this time. The original cast returns to remind us why Hocus Pocus became a cult classic, and new players give fans being introduced to the franchise wonderful characters to cheer on, although Hannah Waddingham should have been given more to do. Some shoddy greenscreen work pulls Hocus Pocus 2 down, but otherwise it feels like a Disney Channel Original Movie in a charming way." Nell Minow of RogerEbert.com gave the film three and a half stars out of four, writing, "Nearly 30 years later, Hocus Pocus 2 should make fans of all generations happy, paying tribute to the original and adding some gentle updating and some welcome diversity, subtracting some violence. It is also a little bit sweeter."

Lovia Gyarkye of The Hollywood Reporter wrote, "The sisters slink and snake their way through Salem on Halloween night, making quips and jokes about the oddities of contemporary life with their signature sharp tongues and quick wit. They still have a thirst for evil and a disdain for children, but their bite is dulled by the film’s interest in softening them." In a "B-" review, Jude Dry of IndieWire wrote, "This year, the fun continues with a totally satisfactory sequel that brings the Sanderson sisters back to life one more time. OK, so the plot is basically the same and the jokes mere updates to the original. [...] Unfortunately, their mean streaks seem to have softened over the years, and the movie relies on a manufactured sisterly bond to wrap things up. The script adds a saccharine sweetness along with its teen feminist morality play, as if it's far too aware of sending a message. Some things, it seems, are better left buried." Benjamin Lee of The Guardian gave the film two stars out of four, writing, "Bette Midler returns with her child-killing sisters in a disappointingly flat follow-up that tries too hard to soften the villains." Helen O'Hara of Empire Magazine gave the film two stars out of five, saying, "This is just as unevenly plotted as the original, lacks even the element of surprise, and is not by any reasonable standard 'good'. Between gooey and ghoulish, there must be better options."

Accolades 
The film is one of the media that received the ReFrame Stamp for the years 2022 to 2023. The stamp is awarded by the gender equity coalition ReFrame and industry database IMDbPro for film and television projects that are proven to have gender-balanced hiring, with stamps being awarded to projects that hire female-identifying people, especially women of color, in four out of eight key roles for their production.

Future 
In March 2023, Bette Midler appeared on the red carpet at the Costume Designers Guild. When asked about a possibility of a third film by E! News, she stated: "I'm not sure. Everything is weird. I don't know, maybe. Who knows?"

References

External links 
 
 

2022 films
2022 comedy films
2022 fantasy films
2020s American films
2020s children's comedy films
2020s children's fantasy films
2020s English-language films
2020s fantasy comedy films
American children's comedy films
American children's fantasy films
American fantasy comedy films
American films about Halloween
American sequel films
American slapstick comedy films
American supernatural comedy films
American zombie comedy films
Dark fantasy films
Disney+ original films
Films about curses
Films about hypnosis
Films about Satanism
Films about sisters
Films about virginity
Films about witchcraft
Films directed by Anne Fletcher
Films scored by John Debney
Films set in the 1650s
Films set in 2022
Films set in Massachusetts
Films set in the Thirteen Colonies
Films shot in Rhode Island
Films with screenplays by David Kirschner
Hocus Pocus
Resurrection in film
Walt Disney Pictures films